Tabelot is a village and rural commune in Niger. As of 2011, the commune had a total population of 32,431 people.

References

Communes of Niger